The Russian monitor Charodeika was the lead ship of her class of monitors built for the Imperial Russian Navy in the 1860s. She served for her entire career with the Baltic Fleet, mostly as a training ship. She was decommissioned in 1907, but was not broken up until 1911–12.

Design and description
The ship was designed to displace , but turned out to be overweight and actually displaced . Her crew numbered 13 officers and 171 crewmen in 1877.

The ship had two simple horizontal direct-acting steam engines, each driving a single propeller. The engines were designed to produce a total of  using steam provided by two coal-fired rectangular fire-tube boilers, but only achieved  and a speed of approximately  during her sea trials.

Charodeika was initially armed with a pair of  rifled Model 1867 guns in the forward gun turret and a pair of  smoothbore Rodman guns in the aft turret. The Rodman guns were replaced by a pair of Obukhov  rifled guns in 1871 and all of the nine-inch guns were replaced in their turn by longer, more powerful nine-inch Obukhov guns in 1878–79. No light guns for use against torpedo boats are known to have been fitted aboard the ship before the 1870s when she received 4 four-pounder  guns mounted on the turret tops as well as a variety of smaller guns that included  Engström quick-firing (QF) guns,  Nordenfelt guns, single-barreled QF  Hotchkiss guns, QF  Hotchkiss revolving cannon, and  Palmcrantz-Nordenfelt guns.

Construction and service
Charodeika (Sorceress) was ordered on 26 January 1865 and construction began on 10 June at the Admiralty Shipyard, Saint Petersburg, although the formal keel-laying was not until 6 June 1866. She was launched on 12 September 1867 and completed in 1869 at the cost of 762,000 rubles. Construction was considerably delayed by late deliveries of drawings, material, and the death of her original builder. The ship served her entire career with the Baltic Fleet and was later assigned to the Mine (Torpedo) Training Detachment. Charodeika was reclassified as a coast-defense ironclad on 13 February 1892 and remained in service until 31 March 1907 when she was turned over to the Port of Kronstadt for disposal. The ship was stricken from the Navy List on 7 April and was finally scrapped in 1911–12.

Notes

Footnotes

Bibliography

Further reading

Ships of the Imperial Russian Navy
1867 ships
Charodeika-class monitors
Ships built at Admiralty Shipyard